Fred White (May 29, 1936 – May 15, 2013) was an American sportscaster.

White called Kansas City Royals games for 25 years, from 1974 to 1998. In addition, he was the voice of the Kansas State Wildcats for many years, as well as being the sports anchor at WIBW-TV in Topeka, Kansas. He also called events for ESPN, CBS, NBC, and TBS.

White was born and raised in Homer, Illinois and graduated from Eastern Illinois University.  On May 14, 2013, The Kansas City Royals announced that White was retiring after 40 years with the organization.  He died on May 15, 2013, at the age of 76, just 2 weeks before his 77th birthday, of complications from melanoma.

References

1936 births
2013 deaths
Place of death missing
National Basketball Association broadcasters
American radio sports announcers
American television sports announcers
College basketball announcers in the United States
College football announcers
National Football League announcers
Deaths from melanoma
Eastern Illinois University alumni
Kansas City Chiefs announcers
Kansas City Royals announcers
Major League Baseball broadcasters
People from Homer, Illinois
Deaths from cancer in Kansas